Charles Leroy "Roy" (Bob) Mackert (February 2, 1894 – February 12, 1942) was an American football player. He played professional football for the Rochester Jeffersons for one season in 1925. Mackert played college football for Maryland, and returned there in 1935 as the line coach.

Mackert was born on February 2, 1894, in Sunbury, Pennsylvania. He attended Lebanon Valley College and then the University of Maryland. He played as a fullback on the Maryland football team during the 1919 and 1920 seasons.

Mackert played for the Rochester Jeffersons in the National Football League (NFL) for the 1925 season. Mackert saw action in two games, including one start, as a center and a tackle. By November 1925, George Mulligan of the Hartford Blues signed Mackert to play for the team alongside Obie Bristow, Steve Owen and Don Miller of Notre Dame's Four Horsemen. The Blues would become an NFL franchise a year later in 1926.

In 1926, Mackert returned to his alma mater as an assistant alongside Burton Shipley under head coach Curley Byrd. In 1935, he served as the line coach under Jack Faber. During World War II, Mackert enlisted in the United States military. Although several sources, including the Pro Football Hall of Fame claim that he was killed during the war, he died at a hospital in Washington D.C. after a lengthy illness unrelated to the conflict.

The Charles Leroy Mackert Award was named in his honor and acknowledged the most outstanding wrestlers at the University of Maryland. He was inducted into the University of Maryland Athletic Hall of Fame in 1982.

References

External links
 

1894 births
1942 deaths
American football fullbacks
American football centers
American football tackles
Hartford Blues players
Maryland Terrapins football coaches
Maryland Terrapins football players
Rochester Jeffersons players
American military personnel of World War II
People from Sunbury, Pennsylvania
Coaches of American football from Pennsylvania
Players of American football from Pennsylvania
Military personnel from Pennsylvania